David Yuryevich Dzakhov (born 6 October 1988) is a Russian professional footballer. He plays for FC Alania Vladikavkaz.

Club career
He made his debut in the Russian Premier League on 26 April 2009 for FC Amkar Perm.

After his contract with FC Amkar Perm expired in summer of 2015, he took half a year away from professional football, before rejoining Amkar in January 2016.

External links

References

1988 births
Sportspeople from Vladikavkaz
Living people
Russian footballers
Russia youth international footballers
Association football midfielders
FC Amkar Perm players
FC Volgar Astrakhan players
FC Neftekhimik Nizhnekamsk players
FC Shinnik Yaroslavl players
FC Orenburg players
FC Luch Vladivostok players
FC Tyumen players
Russian Premier League players
Russian First League players
Russian Second League players